Ruth del Carmen Grajeda González (born July 31, 1980 in Ciudad Cuauhtémoc, Chihuahua) is a Mexican sprinter, who specialized in the 400 metres. She won two gold medals, as a member of the Mexican relay team, at the 2006 Ibero-American Championships in Ponce, Puerto Rico, and at the 2008 Ibero-American Championships in Iquique, Chile.

Grajeda competed for the women's 4 × 400 m relay at the 2008 Summer Olympics in Beijing, along with her teammates Zudikey Rodríguez, Gabriela Medina, and Nallely Vela. Running the start-off leg, Grajeda recorded her individual-split time of 54.71 seconds, and the Mexican team went on to finish the second heat in seventh place, for a total time of 3:30.36.

Achievements

References

External links

NBC 2008 Olympics profile

Mexican female sprinters
Living people
Olympic athletes of Mexico
Athletes (track and field) at the 2008 Summer Olympics
World Athletics Championships athletes for Mexico
Sportspeople from Chihuahua (state)
1980 births
People from Ciudad Cuauhtémoc, Chihuahua
Central American and Caribbean Games medalists in athletics
Olympic female sprinters